The Kodak Cine Special 16mm Cameras (CKS) are a family of precision, versatile, spring-wound 16mm silent movie cameras produced by Eastman Kodak from the 1930s to the 1960s, and intended for advanced consumers and industry professionals.  While its rectangular format was typical of earlier Kodak 16 mm cameras (such as Cine-Kodak, Kodak Models B, F and K), the CKS 'box' was formed by two joined sections: the spring motor half with the user controls, winding cranks, and gear work to the shutter.  The other half was a film magazine which docked to the motor.  This allowed the cinematographer to pre-load multiple magazines of film for quick interchange of film.

Standard features included:

 Interchangeable lenses
 Variable shutter creating fades and dissolves effects
 Reflex focusing
 Quick-change film magazines
 100’ film magazines
 Chime warning when the spring is almost unwound
 Slots in front of the lens in which to insert masks of various shapes
 Manual cranking shafts: 1 frame per turn and 8 frames per turn.
 Two-lens turret

Optional features included:
 Owner’s name engraved on bottom of lens turret
 200' film magazines
 Motor Drive
 Tripod

Models 

The first edition (CKS-1) appears in the early 1930s with a two-lens turret.  The flat (planar) shape of the turret limited the types of lenses that could be mounted - long lenses would physically and optically interfere with the taking lens.  The post-war innovation of the Cine Special II (CKS-II) beveled the turret face so the lens mounts were not parallel . Kodak also made a military version with black, non-reflective metal instead of chrome.

Lenses 

The CKS-1 turret holds 2 lenses.  Both positions secure a mounting bracket to connect to lenses.  One position is the Cine-Kodak mount, with a fixed 25mm lens.   The other position is the Kodak S-mount distinguished by an alignment pin and secured by a screw collar. The latter allows for insertion of interchangeable lenses.  The mounting brackets have tilt-up viewfinders with masks according to the focal length.

Additional Kodak lens information is on this page:  "Kodak Cine Lenses"

Filters: The CKS family was able to utilize the Kodak TriColor Filter.  A 1920s technology using special panchromatic film with a lenticular layer behind the emulsion. This filter separates and distributes the colors in a method analogous to pixels today.  KodaScope Model B 16mm projectors reconstructed the original color distribution by placing counterpart tricolor filter places over the projection lens. Further explanation is available on this page: Kodacolor (filmmaking)

Accessories (Aftermarket) 

Due to strong acceptance of the CKS in professional use a creative aftermarket of CKS extensibility grew.

 Kodacolor filter for lenses
 Matte box
 Device to automatically open and close the shutter (for fades) linked to the main spring shaft. 
 Multiple sources of Motor drives that coupled to the 1-frame per turn shaft
 A Kodak variable speed motor drive
 CECO variable speed motor drive
 CECO 24 fps synchronous motor drive
 CECO blimp for camera and motor drive
 Auricon synchronous motor drive for 24fps
 Auricon sound blimp
 Electronic shutter release control (~ 1940)
 Electronic intervalometer for time lapse photography (~ 1940)
 Animation controller and motor from J-K Camera Engineering
 Magnasync NOMAD magnetic film recorder for double-system sound coupled to the drive CKS drive shaft (~ 1960’s)

Patents 
This table identifies the patents covering CKS technologies, providing good date references.

The following table identifies lens and filter patents of the CKS Series.

Subsequent Camera History 

Following the CKS Kodak introduced the synchronous, electric drive Kodak Reflex Special with a 400' magazine.

Bach-Auricon began delivery of electric, 16mm sound cameras in the early 1940s, and these were produced through the 1970s.

References

Kodak cameras
Movie cameras